Brallo di Pregola (Ligurian: Bràl ēd Preigöra) is a comune (municipality) in the Province of Pavia in the Italian region Lombardy, located about 80 km south of Milan and about 50 km south of Pavia. As of 31 December 2004, it had a population of 832 and an area of 46.3 km².

Geography
Located in the Oltrepò Pavese, at the borders of Lombardy with Emilia-Romagna, Brallo di Pregola borders the municipalities of Bobbio (PC), Cerignale (PC), Corte Brugnatella (PC), Santa Margherita di Staffora and Zerba (PC).

Demographics

References

External links

Cities and towns in Lombardy